William French Anderson (born December 31, 1936) is an American physician, geneticist and molecular biologist. He is known as the "father of gene therapy". He graduated from Harvard College in 1958, Trinity College, Cambridge University (England) in 1960, and from Harvard Medical School in 1963.  In 1990 he was the first person to succeed in carrying out gene therapy by treating a 4-year-old girl suffering from severe combined immunodeficiency (a disorder called "bubble boy disease").   In 2006, he was convicted of sexual abuse of a minor and in 2007 was sentenced to 14 years in prison.  He was paroled on May 17, 2018, for good behavior.

Early life and education
Anderson was born in Tulsa, Oklahoma to his two parents. His father was a civil engineer, his mother was a journalist and writer, and he had two older sisters. His was a very happy childhood. He was recognized in high school for his scholarship, interest in science, and prowess on the track team. He won an Honorable Mention in the Westinghouse Science Talent Search for a project demonstrating how Roman numerals could be used in arithmetical procedures. He graduated in 1954 from Tulsa Central High School.

Anderson went to Harvard College, where he published several papers as an undergraduate: his high school work on Roman numerals in classical philology in 1956, arithmetical operations using Minoan linear B numerals in the American Journal of Archaeology in 1958, a physical chemistry research paper in the Journal of the American Chemical Society in 1958, and a research study on the effects of irradiation on DNA in the Journal of Cellular and Comparative Physiology in 1961. In its March 19, 1956 issue, Time magazine called Anderson a "Harvard Prodigy" for his research work on ancient numerical systems.  He graduated from Harvard in 1958, and spent two years at Trinity College, Cambridge University (England), where he obtained an M.A., worked in the laboratory of Francis Crick, won a Full Blue on the track team, and met, and in 1961 married Kathy, who was a fellow medical student at Cambridge.

He returned to Harvard, to the medical school, and was joined there by Kathy a year later. Anderson graduated in 1963 and spent a year internship in pediatric medicine at Children's Hospital in Boston. His wife graduated in 1964 and went on to have a very distinguished career in pediatric surgery. Anderson, after his intern year, spent a year conducting bacterial genetics research at Harvard Medical School and published his work in the Proceedings of the National Academy of Sciences USA in 1965.

Career
Anderson then spent two years, 1965–1967,  under the tutelage of Marshall Nirenberg in a laboratory at the National Institutes of Health, where he helped finish the decipherment of the genetic code. Nirenberg rewarded his efforts by allowing him to make the first public presentation of the final genetic code before an audience of approximately 2,000 scientists at the April 1966 meeting of FASEB in Atlantic City. After his successful post-doctoral fellowship with Nirenberg, Anderson was given his own laboratory in the NIH in July 1967. He made clear from the beginning that his goal was to develop a way to give a normal gene to children with a genetic defect in order to cure the genetic disease. He, therefore, decided to begin by studying human disease on the molecular level. Over his career, he has published more than 400 research papers, 39 editorials, and 5 books, and has received numerous awards and honors including 5 honorary doctorate degrees.

Discovery of eukaryotic protein synthesis initiation factors 
As Anderson began his own career, protein synthesis in bacteria was at the forefront of molecular biology research. He set out to discover protein synthesis initiation factors in mammals. His first major accomplishment, in 1970, was the isolation from rabbit reticulocytes (immature red blood cells) of several factors that initiated hemoglobin synthesis on reticulocyte ribosomes.  It was later learned that these factors also initiated protein synthesis in essentially all eukaryotic systems.

Development of a cell-free protein synthesizing system 
In order to isolate the predicted molecule "messenger RNA", a cell-free protein synthesizing system of mRNA-free ribosomes was needed. Initially, a cell-free tRNA-dependent protein synthesizing system was developed from rabbit reticulocytes ribosomes, using the endogenous mRNA on the ribosomes. An analogous system was developed with human reticulocyte ribosomes.

Isolation of human messenger RNA 
A procedure was developed for stripping the putative mRNA from the ribosomes. This ribosomal wash from rabbit reticulocyte ribosomes was incubated in a cell-free system and rabbit hemoglobin was produced.  The procedure for stripping endogenous mRNA from rabbit reticulocyte ribosomes was used on human reticulocyte ribosomes to obtain human globin mRNA.

Synthesis of normal and mutant globin proteins using human globin mRNA 
Stripped rabbit reticulocyte ribosomes were programmed with mRNA isolated from thalassemia, sickle cell anemia, or normal human reticulocytes. The rabbit ribosome cell-free system was able to produce normal human globin from normal human mRNA, sickle cell globin from sickle cell mRNA, and the abnormal alpha/beta globin chain abnormality of thalassemia from thalassemia mRNA.

Microinjection of globin DNA into mammalian cell nuclei 
As a first approach for developing a human gene therapy procedure, standard microinjection techniques were modified to permit the injection of DNA plasmids into the nucleus of mammalian cells.  Human globin genes were microinjected into mouse fibroblasts and into mouse oocytes and shown to express human globin mRNA.

Development of retroviral gene therapy vectors 
Microinjecting a few non-stem cells was clearly not an efficient procedure for a clinical protocol. In 1984, Anderson published a major review in Science in which he analyzed the "Prospects for Human Gene Therapy" and concluded that the most promising approach was to use retroviral vectors as a delivery vehicle. He immediately established a close, long-term collaboration with one of the top retroviral vector scientists: Eli Gilboa, then at Princeton. Together they developed vectors that could efficiently carry a gene package into mouse or human cells in culture.

The most efficient vector, N2, carrying a neomycin resistance gene, was used to transduce mouse bone marrow cells. The N2-transduced cells were injected into lethally irradiated mice where they repopulated the marrow. The presence and expression of the N2 vector could be detected in the repopulated mouse bone marrow cells by testing for the resistance of the marrow cells to the toxic antibiotic neomycin.

Once the procedure was working successfully in mice, successful studies were done in non human primates. In addition, extensive safety studies were done in the vector transduced animals.

Successful gene therapy of a human patient 
Attempting to perform gene therapy by inserting recombinant DNA into a human being was extremely controversial after an illegal attempt was made in 1980. Anderson, together with bioethicist John Fletcher, set the ethical standard for this type of clinical protocol in his 1980 article in The New England Journal of Medicine entitled: "Gene Therapy In Human Beings: When Is It Ethical To Begin?" An extensive regulatory process was established during the late 1980s, including the creation of the Human Gene Therapy Subcommittee as a first round of regulatory oversight. Only after approval by that formal public governmental review did the gene therapy clinical protocol move on for review by the Recombinant DNA Advisory Committee (RAC), the FDA, and other ethics/regulatory committees. The media followed every step closely.

Anderson teamed with Michael Blaese, a prominent immunologist in the National Cancer Institute (NCI), and Steven Rosenberg, a prominent cancer surgeon and immunotherapy advocate, also in the NCI. The initial protocol was a safety study where only the N2 vector, previously shown to be safe when used in non-human primates, was administered to cancer patients, on Rosenberg's NCI clinical cancer service, who volunteered for the study. A full "gene therapy" regulatory review was carried out. The clinical protocol began on May 22, 1989, and included 10 patients. The procedure was shown to be safe. Rosenberg went on to develop gene therapy/immunotherapy clinical protocols for cancer.

Anderson and Blaese carried out the first gene therapy protocol, on a 4-year-old girl, named Ashanthi DeSilva, who was critically ill with adenosine deaminase deficiency severe combined immunodeficiency disease (ADA SCID). Preliminary studies included development of a retroviral vector containing the ADA gene together with additional safety features, creation of ADA deficient human T cell lines used for testing ADA vectors, and creation of a biotechnology company, Genetic Therapy Inc., to manufacture the ADA vector, called LASN, under strict GMP FDA requirements. Anderson also created, and became editor-in-chief of, a new journal, Human Gene Therapy, in 1990. This new journal published not only original scientific research papers but also articles on ethical and regulatory issues relating to gene therapy.

Ashanthi received her first infusion of cells on September 14, 1990, with no complications. She received 10 more infusions over the next 2 years. Her immune evaluation studies became normal and she became healthy with no major infections. A thorough immune status follow-up was done after 12 years: she remained healthy with 20% of her lymphocytes still carrying an active retroviral ADA gene – a sufficient percentage to ensure immunologic protection. She is now 33 years old, married, and works as a journalist and writer.

Late career research projects 
In 1992, Anderson followed his wife to Los Angeles, where she accepted the position of chief of surgery at Los Angeles Children's Hospital. He became professor of biochemistry and pediatrics at the University of Southern California (USC). Anderson maintained his intense interest in gene therapy and was able to develop a retroviral gene therapy vector that could target the collagen matrix surrounding cancer nodules. He wrote a number of reviews of gene therapy in both the scientific literature and in the popular literature.

Anticipating the value of lab-on-a-chip technology for the molecular analysis of individual cells, Anderson joined forces with Stephen Quake, professor of applied physics at California Institute of Technology. Quake was developing lab-on-a-chip technology using soft polymers. Anderson became a visiting associate in applied physics at Caltech from 2001 to 2006, while maintaining his USC positions, and succeeded in developing an improved microfluidic valve that was patented and has become the core of soft polymer lab-on-a-chip devices.

His final project before he was arrested was the discovery and identification of a factor in the serum of irradiated animals that could rescue lethally irradiated animals even 24 hours after the irradiation. Purification from the serum demonstrated that the factor was Interleukin 12. During the 12 years that Anderson has been in prison, IL-12 has been shown to potentially be a very important adjuvant drug in cancer treatment.

Other activities

Sports medicine 
Anderson has been a ring doctor and tournament doctor in a large number of competitions. In 1981, he became the team physician for the National Taekwondo Team, and was also the team physician at the 1988 Olympics in Seoul Korea when taekwondo became an Olympic sport. He has written several sports medicine articles on prevention and treatment of taekwondo injuries. In addition, he was chairman of the medical committee of the World Taekwondo Federation from 1985 to 1988.

Forensic medicine 
Anderson is best known in forensic medicine for his forensic analysis of the famous April 11, 1986 FBI firefight which, at the time, was the deadliest firefight in the history of the FBI. His analysis, privately printed in 1996, was accepted by the FBI as the official version, and every new FBI agent was given a copy of his report. After 10 years, the FBI allowed Anderson to make the report public, and it was published with a new foreword by Paladin Press in 2006.

Anderson also published a forensic analysis of the Warren Earp killing, as well as a study of the bruises beneath soft body armor when bullets of various calibers strike a person wearing the armor.

Sexual abuse conviction 
Anderson was arrested on July 30, 2004, on allegations of sexual abuse of a minor girl. He was convicted and jailed on July 19, 2006, of three counts of lewd acts upon a child under the age of 14, and one count of continuous sexual abuse. On February 2, 2007, he was sentenced to 14 years in prison and ordered to pay $68,000 in restitution, fines, and fees.  The victim was the daughter of his senior lab scientist and business partner. The jury was played a sting meeting recording between Anderson and the victim in which Anderson is heard to say a number of damaging statements. He lost all his appeals through the court system, and served his entire sentence, which was shortened based on good behavior. He was released from prison on May 17, 2018, and is currently serving a 5-year parole.

Published books 
Development of Iron Chelators for Clinical Use. Anderson, W.F. and Hiller, H.C., eds., DHEW Publ. No. (NIH) 76-994, 1976.

Fourth Cooley's Anemia Symposium. Anderson, W.F.; Bank, A.; Zaino, E.C., eds., Ann. NY Acad. Sci., Vol. 344, 1980.

Development of Iron Chelators for Clinical Use: Proceedings of the Second Symposium. Martell, A.E.; Anderson, W.F.; Badman, D., eds., Elsevier-North Holland, New York, 1981.

Fifth Cooley's Anemia Symposium. Bank, A.; Anderson, W.F.; Zaino, E.C., eds., Ann. NY Acad. Sci., Vol. 445, 1985.

Forensic Analysis of the April 11, 1986, FBI Firefight. Anderson, W.F., Paladin Press, 2006.

Awards and honors

References

Further reading
Burke, Bob and Barry Epperson (2003), W French Anderson: Father of Gene Therapy, Oklahoma Heritage Association, 
Lewis, Ricki (2012), The Forever Fix: Gene Therapy and the Boy Who Saved It, St. Martin's Press, 
Lyon, Jeff and Peter Gomer (1995), Altered Fates: Gene Therapy and the Retooling of Human Life, W.W. Norton & Company, 
Thompson, Larry (1994), Correcting The Code: Inventing the Genetic Cure for the Human Body, Simon & Schuster,

External links 
Colleagues upset by Anderson sentence", The Scientist, February 5, 2007
Molest Conviction Unravels Gene Pioneer's Life", Wired, September 25, 2007
Brandeis Brief in the Case of In Re William French Anderson, January 2, 2013
Dr. French Anderson's Letter From Prison, INI World Report, September 28, 2014
"Father of Gene Therapy" to be Released from Prison Next Month: W. French Anderson Intends to Resume a Career in Science, GEN Exclusives, April 11, 2018
French Anderson, "Father" of Gene Therapy, Released from Prison, PLOS Biogs, May 18, 2018
Out of prison, the 'father of gene therapy' faces a harsh reality: a tarnished legacy and an ankle monitor", STAT, July 23, 2018
Life Interrupted: French Anderson on Gene Therapy, CRISPR, and the Kitchen Sink Approach: Gene Therapy Pioneer Plans Next Steps Following Release from Prison", GEN Exclusives, July 26, 2018

1936 births
Living people
Alumni of Trinity College, Cambridge
American geneticists
American people convicted of child sexual abuse
Central High School (Tulsa, Oklahoma) alumni
Harvard College alumni
Harvard Medical School alumni
People from Tulsa, Oklahoma
University of Southern California faculty